Elizabeth II was Queen of Guyana from 1966 to 1970, when Guyana was independent sovereign state with a constitutional monarchy. She was also the sovereign of the other Commonwealth realms, including the United Kingdom. Her constitutional roles were delegated to the governor-general of Guyana.

History
The Crown colony of British Guiana became an independent country called Guyana on 26 May 1966, with Queen Elizabeth II as head of state and Queen of Guyana. The Duke and Duchess of Kent, represented the Queen of Guyana at the independence celebrations. The Duke opened the first session of the Guyanese Parliament, on behalf of the Queen, and gave the speech from the throne.

The Queen's constitutional roles were mostly delegated to the Governor-General of Guyana, her representative in Guyana, who was appointed by the Queen on the advice of her Guyanese Prime Minister. The Governor-General acted on the advice of the Guyanese ministers. Three governors-general held office: Sir Richard Luyt (1966), Sir David Rose (1966–1969), and Sir Edward Luckhoo (1969–1970). All executive powers of Guyana were vested in the monarch, but were mostly exercised by the governor-general on her behalf.

The new Guyanese constitution provided for the country to become a republic after 45 months by a majority vote in the House of Assembly. Exactly 45 months from independence, Guyana became a republic within the Commonwealth, with the president of Guyana as head of state.

The Queen visited Guyana on 4–5 February 1966, where she opened the Queen Elizabeth II National Park (now Guyana National Park).

She toured Guyana as Head of the Commonwealth on 19–22 February 1994.

Styles
Elizabeth II had the following styles in her role as the monarch of Guyana:
26 May 1966 – 18 June 1966: Elizabeth the Second, by the Grace of God, of the United Kingdom of Great Britain and Northern Ireland and of Her other Realms and Territories Queen, Head of the Commonwealth, Defender of the Faith

18 June 1966 – 23 February 1970: Elizabeth the Second, by the Grace of God, Queen of Guyana and of Her other Realms and Territories, Head of the Commonwealth

References

Government of Guyana
Politics of Guyana
Guyana
Heads of state of Guyana
1966 establishments in Guyana
1970 disestablishments in Guyana
Former Commonwealth monarchies
Former monarchies of South America
Political history of Guyana
Titles held only by one person